Flores Island is a small island (approximately 155 km2) in Clayoquot Sound, off the west coast of Vancouver Island, British Columbia, Canada.

The area of Marktosis (population around 900) holds the only major settlement on the island. Most residents are members of the Ahousaht nation (population around 2000) and form the largest part of the Nuu-chah-nulth or Nootka First Nation. Some of the indigenous language is spoken though English is predominant.

Residing within the Clayoquot Sound Biosphere Reserve, Flores holds one of the largest tracts of contiguous old-growth forest on Vancouver Island. 41 km2 of the island has been demarcated as the Flores Island Marine Provincial Park,  1.43 km2 is the Gibson Marine Provincial Park where hot springs are located at the southern banks of the Matilda Inlet, the Marktosis reservation is 1.2 km2 and the rest is Crown Land.

Flores Island was named in 1791 by Francisco de Eliza, in honor of Manuel Antonio Flórez, the 51st viceroy of New Spain.

The main industry is fishing with some tourism. Tourism is promoted through the 'Walk the Wild Side' hiking trail and the addition of accommodation at the Aauuknuck Lodge. Cow Bay on the Western side of the Island has been voted as one of Canada's top ten beaches.

The island can be reached by water-taxi or seaplane from Tofino.

See also
List of islands of British Columbia
British Columbia Coast

References

External links

 - the wild side trail
 Information of trail-running the Flores Island Wild Side Trail

Islands of British Columbia
Clayoquot Sound region
Landforms of Vancouver Island